The North Woolwich Old Station Museum was a small railway museum in North Woolwich, in Newham, East London. Located in the former Great Eastern Railway terminal station building at North Woolwich railway station, the museum opened in 1984. It closed in 2008.

History 
The station building at North Woolwich was opened in 1847, and was designed by Sir William Tite. The building was in use as a ticket office until 1979 when it was replaced by a more austere building on the one remaining platform. It was derelict for many years until its opening as a museum by the Queen Mother on 20 November 1984. It had been established by the London Borough of Newham and the building owner, the Passmore Edwards Museum Trust.

The line was electrified in 1985 when it became part of the North London Line but closed on 9 December 2006, following the opening of the Docklands Light Railway in the local area.  

The collections included historical materials on railways in East London, model trains, and a non-operational steam locomotive. The building was also used for some local community functions. The station building was Grade II-listed in 1998.

Closure 
By 2008, the Borough of Newham was no longer able to finance the Museum. Its closure was finalised in November 2008. By 2011 all externally visible displays including the rolling stock and signage had been removed. Most loans were returned to their private lenders, with other items dispersed to the East Anglian Railway Museum, Mangapps Railway Museum and the Great Eastern Railway Society and some items retained by Newham Heritage Service, also heir to the collections of the Passmore Edwards Museum.

The building has been disused since. It remains owned by the River Lea Tidal Mill Trust (now House Mill Trust).

Locomotives formerly stored

See also
 List of railway museums in the United Kingdom
 Heritage railways
List of heritage railways in the United Kingdom
 Restored trains
 North Woolwich railway station

References

External links
 The House Mill Trust Ltd owners of the building

Railway museums in England
History of rail transport in London
Defunct museums in London
Museums in the London Borough of Newham
Museums established in 1984
Museums disestablished in 2008
1984 establishments in England
2008 disestablishments in England
Woolwich